We People Space with Phantoms is the second album recorded by the Chicago-based No wave band, The Scissor Girls. The album was recorded with the original Scissor Girls lineup, consisting of Azita Youssefi on bass guitar and vocal, SueAnne Zollinger on guitar, and Heather Melowic on drums. This was the final recording to include Zollinger, who left the band following the album's second recording session due to internal conflicts with band members. She was replaced by new member Kelly Kuvo, while the album sat unreleased for two years before the Scissor Girls were able to find a label willing to release the material. Finally, in 1996 the Atatvistic record label agreed to issue the album. Kurt Kellison of Atavistic then offered the Scissor Girls a chance to record two further albums for the indie label, an offer which Youssefi and Melowic accepted, but which Kuvo declined.

Track listing
 The Sequential (2:46)
 A Dedication To Cronies And Goats (4:36)
 In Two Acts (6:26)
 Vamps, Here! (3:13)
 Dismemberment Murder (4:16)
 Skeletal/Binary (4:15)
 World Of Unreal Time (3:05
 Forecast Total Brain Shut-Dwn (2:45)
 S. Mongers (2:10)
 Anti-FUT Nos. 1, 2 (5:08)
 Untitled (3:19)

Personnel
 The Scissor Girls - Main performer
 Azita Youssefi - Bass, vocals
 SueAnne Zollinger - Guitar
 Heather Melowic - Drums

References

 Howell, Stephen. [ The Scissor Girls]. "www.allmusic.com". 2007 All Media Guide, LLC. Accessed August 14, 2007.
 Abebe, Nitsuh. [ We People Space with Phantoms]. "www.allmusic.com". 2007 All Media Guide, LLC. Accessed August 14, 2007.

1996 albums
The Scissor Girls albums
Atavistic Records albums